Oberndorf is a municipality  in the district of Donau-Ries in Bavaria in Germany. The river Lech flows through the village.

Mayors
The mayor is Hubert Eberle, he was elected in 2002.
 Stefan Rößle (CSU), 1996 to 2002
 Franz Döschl, 1978 to 1996

References

Donau-Ries